Morissette is a surname. Notable people with the surname include:

Alanis Morissette (born 1974), a Canadian singer-songwriter
Catherine Morissette (born 1979), a Canadian politician and lawyer
Claire Morissette (1950–2007), a Canadian cycling advocate 
Dave Morissette (born 1971), a Canadian professional ice hockey forward 
Émilien Morissette (born 1927), a Canadian politician
Guillaume Morissette (born 1984), a Canadian fiction writer and poet 
Jean-Guy Morissette (1937–2011), a Canadian professional ice hockey goaltender 
Pierre Morissette (born 1944), a Canadian Roman Catholic bishop

See also
Morisset (disambiguation)
Bill Morrisette (born 1931), an American politician from Oregon
Bill Morrisette (baseball) (1894–1966), an American baseball pitcher
Bill Morrisette, an American guitarist with the band Dillinger Four
Gabriel Morrissette (born 1959), a Canadian illustrator